Spaulding is an unincorporated community in Spaulding Township, Union County, Iowa, United States.

History
Spaulding's population was 58 in 1902, and 50 in 1925.

References

Unincorporated communities in Union County, Iowa
Unincorporated communities in Iowa